Manju S. Ganeriwala (born January 24, 1956) is the former Treasurer of the Commonwealth of Virginia. She was previously the state's Deputy Secretary of Finance before being appointed as state treasurer by Governor Tim Kaine, and was reappointed as state treasurer by three consecutive governors.

Ganeriwala was born in Akola in the Indian state of Maharashtra and grew up in Mumbai. She completed her undergraduate studies at the University of Bombay and earned a Master of Business Administration degree from the University of Texas at Austin. She moved to Virginia and started work with the Virginia Department of Planning and Budget in 1983.

References

External links
Department of the Treasury -- Treasurer Manju Ganeriwala

1956 births
21st-century American politicians
21st-century American women politicians
American politicians of Indian descent
Living people
McCombs School of Business alumni
People from Akola
People from Henrico County, Virginia
State treasurers of Virginia
University of Mumbai alumni
Virginia Independents
Women in Virginia politics